Riski Fajar Saputra (born 27 January 2000) is an Indonesian professional footballer who plays as a forward for Liga 2 club Persekat Tegal.

Club career

PSIS Semarang
He was signed for PSIS Semarang to play in Liga 1 in the 2021 season. Riski made his professional debut on 10 February 2022 in a match against Barito Putera at the Kapten I Wayan Dipta Stadium, Gianyar.

Career statistics

Club

Notes

References

External links
 Riski Fajar at Soccerway
 Riski Fajar at Liga Indonesia

2000 births
Living people
People from Depok
Indonesian footballers
PSIS Semarang players
Association football midfielders
Sportspeople from West Java